The following is a list of the 86 municipalities (comuni) of the Province of Vercelli, Piedmont, Italy.

List

See also 
 List of municipalities of Italy

References 

Vercelli